was a Japanese writer, translator, and stageplay script writer.

In 1927, Katsuya visited England and spoke directly with Sir Robert Baden-Powell about the origin of the Boy Scout movement and the similarities to Satsuma Domain terakoya educational system.

Works 
 『欧州スカウト行脚』／『欧州のスカウト行脚』（成輝堂書房、1928年） 
 『趣味の伊賀路 中大和と伊勢詣で』（笹川臨風らと共著、安進舎・趣味ノ旅叢書、1929年）
 『英人ミルンの徒然草』（A・A・ミルン著、安進舎出版部、1933年）

References

External links

Scouting in Japan
Year of birth missing
Year of death missing